The Bankeraceae are a family of fungi in the order Thelephorales. Taxa are terrestrial, and ectomycorrhizal with plant species in families such as Pinaceae or Fagaceae. The family was circumscribed by Marinus Anton Donk in 1961. According to a 2008 estimate, the family contains 6 genera and 98 species.

Genera 
The family consists of the following genera:

 Bankera
 Boletopsis
 Corneroporus
 Hydnellum
 Phellodon
 Sarcodon

References

External links 
 
 

Thelephorales
Basidiomycota families